Matteo Pelliciari (born 22 January 1979 in Milan, Lombardy) is an Italian freestyle Olympic swimmer.

Pelliciari is an Italian Olympic medallist swimmer having competed mainly as a member of the Italian 4 × 200 m freestyle relay team: 2000 Summer Olympics and 2004 Summer Olympics.

See also
 Italy at the 2000 Summer Olympics

References

External links
 Matteo Pelliciari on agendadiana.com
 Matteo Pelliciari on Italian Swimming Federation's website  

1979 births
Living people
Swimmers from Milan
Italian male swimmers
Olympic swimmers of Italy
Swimmers at the 2000 Summer Olympics
Swimmers at the 2004 Summer Olympics
Olympic bronze medalists for Italy
Olympic bronze medalists in swimming
Italian male freestyle swimmers
World Aquatics Championships medalists in swimming
Medalists at the FINA World Swimming Championships (25 m)
European Aquatics Championships medalists in swimming
Medalists at the 2004 Summer Olympics
Mediterranean Games gold medalists for Italy
Mediterranean Games silver medalists for Italy
Swimmers at the 2001 Mediterranean Games
Swimmers at the 2005 Mediterranean Games
Universiade medalists in swimming
Mediterranean Games medalists in swimming
Universiade gold medalists for Italy
Universiade silver medalists for Italy
Medalists at the 2001 Summer Universiade
21st-century Italian people